"Live Without It" is a song by Australian rock band Killing Heidi, released as the third single from their debut album, Reflector, in April 2000.

Track listing
Yellow cover
 "Live Without It"
 "Teen Angst Unrequited Love Song" (Raw mix)
 "Pins and Needles" (Raw mix)

Purple cover
 "Live Without It" (Radio mix)
 "Teen Angst Unrequited Love Song" (Raw mix)
 "Pins and Needles" (Raw mix)
 "Mascara" (Acoustic mix)
 "Live Without It" (Music video)

Charts

Weekly charts

Year-end charts

Certification

References

2000 singles
Killing Heidi songs
Songs written by Ella Hooper
Songs written by Jesse Hooper
2000 songs
Warner Records singles